West Mecklenburg High School, colloquially known as West Meck, is a high school located in Charlotte, North Carolina, United States. It is part of the Charlotte-Mecklenburg School System and was opened in 1951. The sports teams are known as the Hawks. Besides providing the standard state-mandated high school curriculum, the school also hosts several programs designed for advanced study, including the Academy for Medical Science, the Academy for Tourism and Travel, and Academy of International Languages.

History 
Upon opening in 1951, the school's original mascot was known as the West Meck Indian. The yearbook corresponded to the theme by being known as The Tomahawk. West Mecklenburg's mascot has since been changed to the Hawks.

Athletics 
Sport teams at West Mecklenburg High School include:
 Football
 Cheerleading
 Soccer
 Volleyball
 Cross country
 Golf
 Tennis
 Basketball
 Track and field
 Swimming 
 Wrestling
 Baseball
 Softball

Notable alumni 
 Dyami Brown, NFL wide receiver
 Tommy Helms, former MLB player and manager, 2x All-Star with the Cincinnati Reds, member of the Cincinnati Reds Hall of Fame
 Jason Latour, comic book artist and writer
 Patrick Love, gospel musician
 Chad Tracy, MLB third baseman
 Jim Vandiver, NASCAR Winston Cup Series driver
 Gene Whisnant, Republican politician from the US state of Oregon
 Shaun Wilson, NFL running back
 Naya Tapper, U.S. Olympic rugby player

References

External links 
 West Mecklenburg High School home page

Public high schools in North Carolina
Educational institutions established in 1951
Schools in Charlotte, North Carolina
1951 establishments in North Carolina